Highway West is a 1941 American crime film directed by William C. McGann and starring Brenda Marshall, Arthur Kennedy and William Lundigan. It is a remake of the 1934 film Heat Lightning.

The film's sets were designed by the art director Esdras Hartley.

Synopsis
A woman discovers that her apparently respectable businessmen husband is in fact a notorious bank robber.

Cast

References

Bibliography
 Goble, Alan. The Complete Index to Literary Sources in Film. Walter de Gruyter, 1999.

External links
 

1941 films
1941 crime films
American crime films
Films directed by William C. McGann
Warner Bros. films
1940s English-language films
1940s American films